Amata flavoanalis is a moth of the  family Erebidae. It was described by Seitz in 1926. It is found in Cameroon.

References

 Natural History Museum Lepidoptera generic names catalog

Endemic fauna of Cameroon
flavoanalis
Moths described in 1926
Moths of Africa